The men's double sculls competition at the 2013 Summer Universiade in Kazan took place the Kazan Rowing Centre.

Results

Heats

Heat 1

Heat 2

Heat 3

Repechage

Semifinals

Semifinal 1

Semifinal 2

Finals

Final B

Final A

References 

Rowing at the 2013 Summer Universiade